Oscar Baquela (born October 20, 1957 in San Nicolás de los Arroyos, Buenos Aires, Argentina) is an Argentine former footballer who played for Independiente and Unión Española.

Teams
 Independiente 1975–1979
 Unión Española 1980–1982

Titles
 Independiente 1977 and 1978 (Argentine Championship)

References
 

1957 births
Living people
Argentine footballers
Argentine expatriate footballers
Club Atlético Independiente footballers
Unión Española footballers
Expatriate footballers in Chile
Association football forwards
Sportspeople from Buenos Aires Province
People from San Nicolás de los Arroyos